Yelmek, also rendered Jelmek or Jelmik, is a language of the proposed Trans-Fly – Bulaka River family in West Papua.

Yelmek is spoken west of Merauke, between the Digul River and Mbian River. Notable villages are (from north to south) Yelwayab on the Wanam River, Bibikem, Woboyo, and Dodalim (Dudaling). Related Maklew is spoken in Welbuti village.

The Wanam variety might be a distinct language.

Phonology 
Yelmek proper:

{| 
|m || n || || ŋ
|-
|p || t || || k
|-
|b || d || || g
|-
|w || l || j || 
|}

{| 
|i ||  || u
|-
|e || ə || o
|-
| || a || 
|}

References

Further reading
 Donohue, Mark. n.d. Disagreement in the Yelmek NP. Unpublished MS.

External links 
 Paradisec has a collection of Yelmek materials

Bulaka River languages
Languages of western New Guinea